Deportivo La Coruña's 1997–98 season included its 33rd appearance in La Liga, where it ranked in 12th place. The club also competed in the Copa del Rey and the UEFA Cup.

Summary

1997–98 was to be the first full season in charge for Brazilian coach Carlos Alberto Silva, who had taken over from John Toshack following the Welshman's resignation in February. Silva had a strong start, guiding Deportivo to 3rd in La Liga by the end of the season, and earning them a return to European competition after a year away by qualifying for the 1997–98 UEFA Cup. Their first round opponents were Auxerre, but a 2–1 defeat at Estadio Riazor followed by a goalless draw in France saw Depor eliminated before the end of September.

Deportivo were also far from convincing in La Liga, and a 3–1 home defeat by Real Valladolid on 15th October left them 15th in the table, with just one win from their first six matches. Silva was sacked, and replaced by José Manuel Corral until the end of the season. Corral improved the club's league form slightly, but they were only able to finish the season a disappointing 12th, their lowest placing since 1991–92. They did reach the quarter-finals of the Copa del Rey, but were defeated 3–1 on aggregate by Segunda División side Deportivo Alavés.

Corral made way at the end of the season for Javier Irureta, paving the way for the most successful period of the club's history. Irureta would lead them to their first top flight title only two seasons later.

Players

Squad
Source:

Left club during season

Out on loan for the full season
Source:

Transfers

In

Out

Statistics
Last updated on 14 April 2021.

|-
|colspan="14"|Players who have left the club after the start of the season:

|}

Competitions

La Liga

League table

Positions by round

Matches

Copa del Rey

UEFA Cup

First round

Auxerre won 2–1 on aggregate

References

Deportivo de La Coruna
Deportivo de La Coruña seasons